The Stauffer Mennonites, or "Pikers", are a group of Old Order Mennonites. They are also called "Team Mennonites", because they use horse drawn transportation. In 2015 the Stauffer Mennonites had 1,792 adult members.

History 

Prior to the formation of the Church in 1845, the Stauffer Mennonite Congregation was made up of one of its founders, Jacob Lehman (1723-1794) and his family.

The original church was founded in 1845 when a split occurred in the Lancaster Mennonite Conference in Lancaster County, PA. The more conservative group formed a new church called the Piker Mennonites because their meeting house stood near the “pike” U.S. Route 322 in Earl Township near Hinkletown. In 1916 the original "Pikers" split into the Stauffer Mennonites and the group around bishop John A. Weaver, called Weaver Mennonites, who are less conservative. The schism from the Bowman group in Pennsylvania was about the extent of shunning and divided the congregation 101 to 102. 
While the Weaver Pike Mennonites decreased in numbers and many intermarried into the Wenger Mennonites, the Jacob Stauffer side experiences much growth after 1960s. Now,the Weaver Pike Mennonites are just a remnant group with about 10% of their starting numbers: in 2014 there were only 5 or 6 members remaining.

The Stauffer Pike Mennonites and Weaver Pike Mennonites continue to share the same church building, alternating every Sunday. The original church building, built in 1840, was demolished in late 2016 and already replaced in 2015 with a nearly identical building 75 yards farther from Route 322 behind the horsesheds. 
The reasons were that understandable church services were harder to perform under the traffic conditions of nearby Rt. 322.

However, a very small section of stone wall that was part of the original structure remains standing indicating where the historic structure once stood.
On the same ground the Stauffer Mennonites still use a century-old horse barn beside their normal sheds. This building is the only left over from the past.

Today the name "Stauffer Mennonite" in a broad sense can refer to at least nine different groups, all descending from the church that was founded in 1845. The groups are named after the bishop who founded the group: Jacob Stauffer, Phares Stauffer, Joseph Brubaker, Noah Hoover, Titus Hoover, Aaron Martin, Allen Martin(dissolved), Martin Weaver, and Jonas Weaver groups. Today the Noah Hoovers are mostly counted as a separate group.

In general all of Pike Mennonite groups up to 2016 held to orthodox Mennonite beliefs, strictly Plain dress and forbade cars and modern farm machinery. Shunning was practiced in a stricter way than among other Old Order Mennonite groups.

In 2016 the main Pike Mennonite group, the Stauffer Old Order Mennonite group (as named in an 2020 May article), had a split culminating over the issue of insurance. Bishop Arthur Martin of Snyder County was the leading person who helped deepen the split among the membership, after being expelled and then reinstalled by a supporting Missouri bishop. He was not willing and to deny the cup of wine (Communion)for (expelled) members who still had a certain insurance and many others supported him. Other issues certainly played a role too, especially preaching in the English language, which the group under Arthur Martin introduced into their church services.
 
In Snyder County, the new group calls itself "Riverview Old Order Mennonite Church, Snyder County Conference" under Arthur Martin´s leadership and possibly holds up to 40 % of the former Stauffer Mennonite membership. It went, like all newly formed groups, through a process of consolidation and finding and lost families to more liberal churches, who allow cars, but some also returned to the mother group. In Illinois its branch at Vandalia joined the new formed Midwest Old Order Mennonite Conference (a Wenger Mennonite split-off from 2018). In Snyder County it still tries to join, but the fundamental differing point is its youth behavior (the non-acceptance of specially wild behavior of young Pikers before being baptised by the Wenger split off). 
There is a traditional view of looking away of youth behavior and accepting their wild attitudes before conversion, which the Groffdale Conference and its split off sees unfitting for Christian parents. Groffdale youth is rather defined as tame in comparison to Stauffer Mennonite youth.

Their liberal trends show itself also in their way to preach some or even half English and sing English songs during worship, which would separate them rather from other conservative minded groups and sounds rather of leaving the Old Order Pike Mennonite path at all.  Even the car itself, now forbidden, is in question, as there is tendency to get away with rulings and move forward to Fellowship churches or Conservative Mennonites.

In Lancaster County this split had surprisingly hardly any or even no followers, not even the ministry became divided.
In Illinois it had an harder impact, as just few stayed with the Stauffer Mennonite group, the majority went with the Arthur Martin movement and joined formerly mentioned Midwest Conference.

The main Stauffer Mennonite church has taken a long time to use shunning on members who drifted to this side, in the hope of their return, but finally the "Bann und Meidung" was declared.

Customs and beliefs 
As of 2010, these groups are among the most conservative of all  Mennonites of Swiss and south German ancestry outside the Amish. They stress strict separation from “the world”, avoid excommunicated members (shunning), wear very plain clothing, and do not have electricity or running water. Stauffer Mennonites in general do not wear beards, with the exception of the Noah Hoover Mennonites, who are now considered not to be part of the Stauffer Mennonites in a narrow sense, but of the larger Horse and Buggy Old Order Mennonite movement which formed from later schisms.

Stauffer Mennonite youth are oftentimes known as "wilde Pikers", as there is a higher tendency among them "sowing their oats" before joining church or not joining at all. The local term "Rumspringe" (meaning "jumping around, running around") oftentimes associated with the Amish youth in the same age, defines also for them a time when young people are not baptised yet, but almost adults and have to decide between joining the church (after some experience of the so-called world) or not joining at all. The young Stauffer Mennonites are known to have a higher degree of people not joining church and getting cars while young people and finally leave their upbringing church. Other Old Order Mennonites in the same area, especially Wenger Mennonites are rather known as "tame" young people (zahme, junge Leit).
These descriptions are very much valid for the Lancaster County settlement.

Dresses of Stauffer Mennonite women very much resemble Amish unicolor dresses, in many cases even identical, but normally they are small flowered in comparison to Wenger Mennonite women´s bigger flowered dresses. Hat brims of men are broader.

Congregations and baptized members 

In 1936 the Stauffer Mennonites had 161 baptized members. In 1959 there were 2 congregations with 218 adult members. In 1977 there were 382 members and in 1990 about 700. In 2008 there were 13 Stauffer Mennonite congregations with about 1300 adult members. 
In 2015 there were 17 Stauffer Mennonite congregations with 1792 baptized members and a total population of 4,076.

The Overview for US states shows these memberships according to the 2015 Directory:

Source: Records of Members of the Stauffer Mennonite Church at the Present Time, 2015

The Stauffer Mennonite Directory of 2015 does not include the growth up to the end of 2016, when the split happened. It is assumable the church grew up to 1890 members until Dec. 2016..

According to the newest Stauffer Mennonite church Directory of 2020 their numbers are as follows:

Source: Records of Members of the Stauffer Mennonite Church at the Present Time, 2020

Comparing both Directories, one can see which settlement was affected hard by the split and which hardly or not at all:

Source: Records of Members of the Stauffer Mennonite Church at the Present Time, 2020

A growth of population of a state despite of membership losses would classify young settlements where many children are born of young member families in the twenties.

The loss of 161 members between 2015 and 2020 does not show the real loss of members. To some extent internal growth has outgrown the losses, so that one can assume if appr. 1890 members at the end of 2016 at least 10 % should be counted countrywide as losses. In the Snyder County settlement it meant for Riverview that almost 40 % went with the splitting side. In Illinois the loss is still very much recognizeable, as the congregation shrank immensely, one can assume at least 2/3 split off in late 2016 up to early 2017. In 2020 this is still comparable by now having 29 members and in 2016 there were 77 members. These 29 members now are to some extent the result of internal growth since the end of 2016, those 77 members grew probably up to 80 to the end of 2016 when the split happened.

For actual numbers one should know how many people and members the Stauffer Mennonitengemeinde had just before the exodus of hundreds, or who were later shunned, as the church was hesitant in practising it immediately.

See also
 Groffdale Conference Mennonite Church

Literature 
Scott, Stephen (1996), An Introduction to Old Order and Conservative Mennonite Groups, Intercourse, Pennsylvania: Good Books,

References

External links
Stauffer Mennonite Church in Global Anabaptist Mennonite Encyclopedia Online

Anabaptism
Mennonitism
Old Order Mennonites
Anabaptist organizations established in the 19th century
Religious organizations established in 1845